Adam Ivanovich Martyniuk is a Ukrainian politician, one of leaders of the Communist Party of Ukraine who on several occasions served as the first vice-speaker of the Ukrainian parliament.

Biography
Martyniuk was born in 1950 in a village of Vetly (Zarohizne khutir), Lyubeshiv Raion near the border with Belarus.

In 1972 he graduated the Lutsk State Pedagogical Institute as a teacher of history and social studies and after that worked as a history teacher in school of Velyka Hlusha, Lyubeshiv Raion. In 1972-76 Martyniuk attended aspirantura of the Institute of Social Studies (today – Krypiakevych Institute of Ukrainian Studies, National Academy of Sciences of Ukraine) receiving science degree Candidate of Sciences in history. During that period in 1974-75 he also served in the Soviet Army.

In 1976-81 Martyniuk worked as a scientist for the Institute of Social Sciences. In 1981-88 he worked for the Lviv regional committee of CPU, particularly as a lecturer at the House of Political Science. In 1988-91 Martyniuk held leading positions of the Communist Party in the city of Lviv and was an instructor of ideological department of the Communist Party of Ukraine.

With fall of the Soviet Union, in 1991-93 Martyniuk joined the Socialist Party of Ukraine. During that time he was a security guard in Kyiv for the agrarian company "Ukrayina" and from 1992 the chief editor of newspaper "Tovarishch". With revival of the Communist Party of Ukraine in 1993, he switched to it and was the chief editor of newspaper "Kommunist" (until 1997). In 1994 he lost in parliamentary elections placing fourth in his electoral district (Lviv Oblast).

In 1998 Martyniuk was finally elected to the Verkhovna Rada as sixths on the party list for the Communist Party of Ukraine. Initially a member of the Communist faction in the parliament, in 1998-2000 he was part of non-affiliated. At the end of 2000 Martyuniuk returned to the faction of Communist Party of Ukraine. Since that time he was elected to the Ukrainian parliament for the next four convocations and was member of Communist faction until 2014.

In 2004 Martyniuk's daughter, Nataliya Adamivna Martyniuk as passenger of government vehicle that was involved in a car accident in result of which died an Olympic runner-up and Ukrainian athlete Alexander Beresch.

For the 2006 elections Martyniuk was second on the party list and on several occasions he held position of the first vice-speaker of the parliament. In 2007 Martyniuk headed a temporary special commission (TSC) to present changes to the Constitution of Ukraine. In 2012 with regulation infringements, he headed the session of parliament that voted for the law on languages in Ukraine. Martyniuk chaired several parliamentary committees such as on parliamentary regulations (2002–03) and national security and defense (2012–14).

In the October 2014 Ukrainian parliamentary election Martyniuk was second on the Communist party election list; but the party did not seats since it came 1,12% short to overcome the 5% election threshold.

References

External links
 The life of Communist elite: villa of Adam Martyniuk. Ukrayinska Pravda. 19 May 2011
 Profile at the Chesno
 Adam Martyniuk at the Who is who in Ukraine

1950 births
Living people
People from Volyn Oblast
Lutsk Pedagogical Institute alumni
Communist Party of Ukraine politicians
Politicians of the Ukrainian Soviet Socialist Republic
Communist Party of Ukraine (Soviet Union) politicians
Third convocation members of the Verkhovna Rada
Fourth convocation members of the Verkhovna Rada
Fifth convocation members of the Verkhovna Rada
Sixth convocation members of the Verkhovna Rada
Seventh convocation members of the Verkhovna Rada
Deputy chairmen of the Verkhovna Rada
Recipients of the Order of Prince Yaroslav the Wise, 5th class
Recipients of the Order of Prince Yaroslav the Wise, 4th class
Recipients of the Order of Prince Yaroslav the Wise, 3rd class